The list of ship launches in 1759 includes a chronological list of some ships launched in 1759.


References

1759
Ship launches